Westringia glabra, commonly known as violet westringia,  is a shrub species that is endemic to Australia. It grows to between 0.5 and 3 metres high. Pale purple flowers with red spots appear predominantly between October and December in the species' native range.
The species was formally described in 1810 by botanist Robert Brown, in Prodromus Florae Novae Hollandiae.

References

glabra
Flora of New South Wales
Flora of Victoria (Australia)
Lamiales of Australia
Taxa named by Robert Brown (botanist, born 1773)
Plants described in 1810